John Joseph Cassata (November 8, 1908 – September 8, 1989) was an American prelate of the Roman Catholic Church.  He served as bishop of the Diocese of Fort Worth in Texas from 1969 to 1980.  He previously served as an auxiliary bishop of the Diocese of Dallas-Fort Worth from 1968 to 1969.

Biography

Early life 
Cassata was born in Galveston, Texas, on November 8, 1908.  He attended St. Mary’s Cathedral School in Galveston and then St. Mary’s Boarding School in La Porte, Texas.  While in high school, Cassata worked as a life guard, soda jerk and vendor at an amusement park.

Cassata then travelled to Rome to reside at the Pontifical North American College.  He received a Licentiate in Theology at the Pontifical Urbana University and also studied at Pontifical Gregorian University.

Priesthood 
Cassata was ordained a priest for the Diocese of Galveston by Cardinal Francesco Marchetti Selvaggiani on December 8, 1932.  After his ordination, Cassata was assigned in 1934 as assistant pastor to Holy Name Parish in Houston.  He was named pastor there in 1945. In 1956, the Vatican honored Cassata with the title of domestic prelate.

Auxiliary Bishop of Dallas-Fort Worth 
On March 12, 1968, Pope Paul VI named Cassata as titular bishop of Bida and auxiliary bishop of the Diocese of Dallas-Fort Worth.  He was consecrated bishop by Bishop Thomas Kiely Gorman on June 5, 1968.

Bishop of Fort Worth 
On August 22, 1969, Cassata was appointed by Paul VI as the first bishop of the Diocese of Fort Worth.  On September 16, 1980, Pope John Paul II accepted Cassata's resignation as bishop of Fort Worth. John Cassata died in Houston of complications from cardiac surgery on September 8, 1989 at age 80.

References

1908 births
1989 deaths
People from Galveston, Texas
20th-century Roman Catholic bishops in the United States
Catholics from Texas